Trollz may refer to:

 "Trollz" (song), a 2020 song by 6ix9ine and Nicki Minaj
 Trollz (TV series), an animated show based on the Troll doll

See also
 Troll (disambiguation)